The 1933 Washington & Jefferson Presidents football team was an American football team that represented Washington & Jefferson College as an independent during the 1933 college football season. The team compiled a 2–7–1 record and was outscored by opponents by a total of 47 to 122. Hank Day was the head coach.

Schedule

References

Washington and Jefferson
Washington & Jefferson Presidents football seasons
Washington and Jefferson Presidents football